Sonja Kešerac (born 20 February 1985 in Osijek) is a Croatian rower. Since 2009, Kešerac competes in coxless pairs with Maja Anić.

References

External links 
 

1985 births
Living people
Croatian female rowers
Sportspeople from Osijek
European Rowing Championships medalists